Self-cannibalism is the practice of eating oneself, also called autocannibalism, or autosarcophagy. A similar term which is applied differently is autophagy, which specifically denotes the normal process of self-degradation by cells. While almost an exclusive term for this process, autophagy nonetheless has occasionally made its way into more common usage.

Humans

As a natural occurrence

A certain amount of self-cannibalism occurs unknowingly, as the body consumes dead cells from the tongue and cheeks.

As a disorder or symptom thereof

Fingernail-biting that develops into fingernail-eating is a form of pica.  Other forms of pica include dermatophagia, and compulsion of eating one's own hair, which can form a hairball in the stomach. Left untreated, this can cause death due to excessive hair buildup.

Self-cannibalism can be a form of self harm and a symptom of mental illnesses such as personality disorders, psychosis, or drug addiction.

As a choice
Some people will engage in self-cannibalism as an extreme form of body modification, for example ingesting their own blood or skin. Others will drink their own blood, a practice called autovampirism, but sucking blood from wounds is generally not considered cannibalism. 

Eating one's own placenta has a small following in Western cultures, fostered by celebrities like January Jones. Human placentophagy after childbirth is touted by some as a treatment for postpartum depression and fatigue, among other health benefits, given its high protein, rich iron and nutrient content. However, scientific research is inconclusive as to whether consuming the placenta has any health benefits.

As a crime
Forced self-cannibalism as a form of torture or war crime has been reported. Erzsébet Báthory allegedly forced some of her servants to eat their own flesh in the early 17th century.  Incidents were reported in the years following the 1991 Haitian coup d'état. In the 1990s, young people in Sudan were forced to eat their own ears.

Other animals
The short-tailed cricket is known to eat its own wings.   There is evidence of certain animals digesting their own nervous tissue when they transition to a new phase of life.  The sea squirt (with a tadpole-like shape) contains a ganglion "brain" in its head, which it digests after attaching itself to a rock and becoming stationary, forming an anemone-like organism.  This has been used as evidence that the purpose of brain and nervous tissue is primarily to produce movement. Self-cannibalism behavior has been documented in North American rat snakes: one captive snake attempted to consume itself twice, dying in the second attempt. Another wild rat snake was found having swallowed about two-thirds of its body.

References in Myths and Legends

The ancient symbol Ouroboros depicts a serpent biting its own tail.

Erysichthon from Greek mythology ate himself in insatiable hunger given him, as a punishment, by Demeter.

In an Arthurian tale, King Agrestes of Camelot goes mad after massacring the Christian disciples of Josephus within his city, and eats his own hands.

Manducation 
In 1679, Phillip Rohr published a scientific study of the practice of "grave eating" which he called "manducation" ("Dissertatio de masticatione mortuorum"). The book brought together a wealth of accounts of the corpses found to have "consumed their own shrouds and winding cloths, and even their own limbs and bowels". Rohr also describes particular sounds that are heard from the graves when a corpse either "laps like some thirsty animal" or chews, grunts and groans. The 18th century also produced a considerable amount of literature on the subject.

See also
List of autocannibalism incidents
 Human placentophagy
Eating mucus

Notes

Cannibalism
Eating behaviors
Pica (disorder)
Animal cannibalism
Self-harm